Bedford Commons is a retail power centre in Bedford, Nova Scotia. It is located at interchange 4C of Nova Scotia Highway 102 near Duke Street/Glendale Avenue.

Major Retailers
 Walmart Supercentre
 Canadian Tire (With Mark's) 
 Dollarama
 Winners
 Sport Chek
 Staples 
Michaels
 Value Village (Formerly Future Shop)

Food Establishments 

 McDonald's (in Walmart)
 Tim Hortons
 A&W
 Let's Ko

Transit Access 

Bedford Commons can be reached by Halifax Transit route 88 Bedford Commons. However, the route only runs every two hours during weekday off-peak times.

References

External links 

 Bedford Commons

Companies based in Halifax, Nova Scotia
Buildings and structures in Halifax, Nova Scotia
Power centres (retail) in Canada